Worldnet Television and Film Service was an American state-funded cable and satellite television channel directed to audiences outside of the United States. Its studios were located in Washington, D.C. It broadcast 24 hours a day. Worldnet had the mission to show "a balanced and accurate picture of American society, policies, and people".

History 
Worldnet was launched in 1983.  In the beginning, it worked under the umbrella of  the United States Information Agency (USIA).  Later, Worldnet became part of the Broadcasting Board of Governors (BBG).

Between 1993 and 1997, under the leadership of Clinton appointee Charles Fox, Worldnet’s audience expanded from less than 300 to 1400 broadcast and cable outlets in Africa, the Americas, Europe, and the Middle East.

On September 11, 2001, Worldnet, using Bloomberg Television, interrupted its regular programming on 7 satellites to broadcast raw footage of terrorist attacks in New York City and Washington, DC.

In 2002, Worldnet switched from an analog system to a digital one.

On May 16, 2004, Worldnet was merged into the Voice of America to reduce costs.

Programs 
Programs produced and syndicated by Worldnet were provided in Arabic, Croatian, English, French, Mandarin, Spanish, Russian, Polish, Serbian, Ukrainian, among others. They were transmitted via satellite, and also via foreign TV broadcast and cable systems.

Some of the syndicated programming produced by other U.S. networks included the NewsHour with Jim Lehrer, Nightly Business Report, Computer Chronicles, and Bloomberg Information Television.

American English-teaching telecourses were part of the list of programs. One of them was Crossroads Cafe, which combined comedy, drama, and English skills training.

Law 
The Smith–Mundt Act of 1948 prohibited Worldnet from broadcasting directly to American citizens. The intent of the legislation was to protect the American public from propaganda by its own government.

References 

International broadcasters
Organizations established in 1983
Organizations disestablished in 2004
State media